Fire & Ashes is an EP album by the German symphonic metal band Xandria. This is the band's second release with vocalist Dianne van Giersbergen. The EP features three new tracks, two rerecorded and remastered tracks, and two cover songs. The EP is produced by Joost van den Broek and contains cover art by Felipe Machado Franco and guest vocals by Valerio Recenti, the Italian singer of the Dutch alternative metal band My Propane. The composition "In Remembrance" is a tribute to classical Italian composer Giuseppe Verdi as it is based on the aria "Morrò, ma prima in grazia" from his opera Un Ballo in Maschera.

This is the only EP Dianne van Giersbergen made with Xandria.

Track listing

Personnel
All information from the EP booklet.

Xandria
 Dianne van Giersbergen – vocals
 Marco Heubaum – guitar, vocals, keyboards, producer
 Philip Restemeier – guitar
 Steven Wussow – bass
 Gerit Lamm – drums

Additional musicians
 Valerio Recenti – backing vocals
 Jeroen Goossens – whistles

Production
 Jos Driessen – engineering assistant
 Darius van Helfteren – mastering
 Tim Tronckoe – photography
 Joost van den Broek – recording, mixing, producer
 Felipe Machado Franco – cover art, design

References

2015 EPs
Xandria albums
Napalm Records EPs
Symphonic metal EPs